William Baer may refer to:

William Baer (writer) (born 1948), American poet and professor
William Baer (antitrust lawyer) (born 1950), American antitrust lawyer and current official in the U.S. Department of Justice
William Jacob Baer (1860–1941), American painter